Blondie Goes Latin, also known as Conga Swing, is a 1941 American comedy film directed by Frank R. Strayer and Robert Sparks and starring Penny Singleton, Arthur Lake, and Larry Simms. It is the eighth of the Blondie films. The film showcases musical numbers of Kirby Grant, Ruth Terry, Tito Guizar, with Arthur Lake displaying his drum skills, Penny Singleton her singing and dancing prowess.

Plot summary
 Mr. Dithers generously invites the three Bumsteads to go with him on an ocean cruise to Latin America and "not think about business."  As they are on the ship ready to leave, a telegram arrives from a buyer anxious to meet very soon to purchase a property the Dithers company has had on sale for a long time.  Because Dithers badly needs to relax from stress, it is decided that just Dagwood alone should return home to meet with the client.  However, before Dagwood can debark, the drummer of the ship's dance band is taken ill, so Dagwood, despite his protests, is recruited to take his place.  He dresses as a woman while drumming, so his family and Dithers won't recognize him.  Meanwhile, a handsome Latin gentleman on board shows Blondie attention and dines with her.  In the end, Dagwood's remaining on the ship turns out to be fortuitous, as the client buying the property is revealed as a con man.

Partial cast
 Penny Singleton as Blondie Bumstead  
 Arthur Lake as Dagwood Bumstead  
 Larry Simms as Baby Dumpling Bumstead  
 Daisy as Daisy  
 Ruth Terry as Lovey Nelson, the Singer  
 Danny Mummert as Alvin Fuddle  
 Jonathan Hale as Mr. J.C. Dithers  
 Janet Burston as Little Girl Singer and Piano Player  
 Kirby Grant as Hal Trent, Orchestra Leader 
 Tito Guízar as Manuel Rodríguez

Soundtrack
 You Don't Play a Drum, You Beat It
 Music and Lyrics by Chet Forrest and Bob Wright
 Played by Kirby Grant and Orchestra with Arthur Lake on drums
 Sung by Ruth Terry an orchestra quartet
 Reprised at the end by the orchestra and Penny Singleton
 I Hate Music Lessons
 Music and Lyrics by Chet Forrest and Bob Wright
 Played on piano by Janet Burston
 Sung by Janet Burston and Larry Simms
 Solteiro e melhor
 Music and Lyrics by Ruben Sores and Felisberto Silva
 English Lyrics by William Morgan
 Played by Kirby Grant and Orchestra with Tito Guízar on guitar
 Sung in Spanish by Tito Guízar
 Querida
 Music and Lyrics by Chet Forrest and Bob Wright
 Played by Kirby Grant and Orchestra with Tito Guízar on guitar
 Sung in Spanish by Tito Guízar
 Reprised by Tito Guízar and Penny Singleton singing in English
 Reprised again by Penny Singleton at the end
 You Can Cry On My Shoulder
 Music and Lyrics by Chet Forrest and Bob Wright
 Played by Kirby Grant and Orchestra with Arthur Lake on drums
 Sung by Ruth Terry an orchestra quartet
 Brazilian Cotillion
 Music and Lyrics by Chet Forrest and Bob Wright
 Played by Kirby Grant and Orchestra
 Sung by Tito Guízar, Penny Singleton and the orchestra quartet
 Danced to by Tito Guízar and Penny Singleton
 Reprised at the end with Penny Singleton dancing with Arthur Lake and Larry Simms dancing with Janet Burston

References

Bibliography
 Young, Nancy K. & Young, William H. World War II and the Postwar Years in America: A Historical and Cultural Encyclopedia. ABC-CLIO, 2010.

External links
 
 
 
 

1941 films
American black-and-white films
1941 comedy films
1940s English-language films
Films directed by Frank R. Strayer
Columbia Pictures films
Blondie (film series) films
1940s American films